The PUP Mighty Maroons are the athletic teams of Polytechnic University of the Philippines. The school's teams compete in NAASCU and SCUAA. The teams also have several intercollegiate varsity sports teams for women and men at the university.

Notable alumni
 Jerwin Gaco - PBA player
 Christian Geronimo - KIA Picanto Team Draftee

References

Polytechnic University of the Philippines
College sports teams in Metro Manila